Shishirathil Oru Vasantham is a 1980 Indian Malayalam-language film,  directed by Keyaar. The film stars Shubha, Sukumaran, Kuthiravattam Pappu and Ravikumar. The film has musical score by Shyam.

Cast
Shubha
Sukumaran
Kuthiravattam Pappu
Ravikumar

Soundtrack
The music was composed by Shyam and the lyrics were written by Poovachal Khader.

References

External links
 

1980 films
1980s Malayalam-language films
Films directed by Keyaar